Toco or Toko (from ) is a locality in the Cochabamba Department in central Bolivia. It is the seat of the Toco Municipality, the second municipal section of the Germán Jordán Province. At the time of census 2001 it had a population of 827.

References

External links
 Map of Germán Jordán Province

Populated places in Cochabamba Department